The Sudan National Botanical Garden, established in 1954, is located in Khartoum in the Mogran residential area. The garden contains a collection of living plants in addition to a herbarium.

Location 

The garden is located in the Khartoum Al Mogran area, where the White Nile meets the Blue Nile. The garden area is about 11 acres.

Administration 
The garden is administratively affiliated to the Sudan federal  Ministry of Agriculture and Irrigation. The garden is listed among the oldest gardens in Africa.

The Garden has several departments and units:  
 Seed collection unit.
 Reproduction unit - acclimatization.
 Genetic Resources Conservation Unit.
 Classification unit
 An exchange unit with international parks and research centers.
 Training and Signs Unit.
 Ornamental plants, Coordination and Heritage Unit
 Living unit.
 Unit of plants of economic importance.
 Information tion and Documenttion Unit .

The tasks and objectives 
 Conservation and conservation of plant genetic resources.
 Providing the information and the botanical model for researchers, scholars and hobbyists
 General definition of different plants. Cultivation of new varieties of plants
 Conducting scientific research in the various fields of the plant.
 Care of living, library and seed store.
 Organize the information obtained in various plant sciences.
 Establishing, maintaining and maintaining the gene pool.

Activities 
Among the events hosted by the garden is the annual flower exhibition.

Opening Hours 
The garden and the domain are open on official working days, Sunday to Thursday 09:00 to 03:00, and access requires tickets at the gate.

See also 
List of botanical gardens

External links 
Youtube video about the garden

References 

Botanical gardens in Sudan